Charles Gustav Wilhelm Winckler (April 9, 1867 in Frederiksberg – December 17, 1932 in Frederiksberg) was a Danish athlete and tug of war competitor who participated at the 1900 Summer Olympics.

He finished tenth in the shot put event and eighth in the discus throw event.

He was also part of the Dano-Swedish tug of war team which won the gold medal against opponents France.

References

External links

1867 births
1932 deaths
Danish male shot putters
Danish male discus throwers
Athletes (track and field) at the 1900 Summer Olympics
Tug of war competitors at the 1900 Summer Olympics
Olympic athletes of Denmark
Sportspeople from Frederiksberg
Olympic tug of war competitors of Denmark
Olympic gold medalists for Denmark
Olympic medalists in tug of war
Medalists at the 1900 Summer Olympics